Ethiopian Insurance Football Club (Amharic: ኢትዮጵያ መድን እግር ኳስ ክለብ), also known as Ethiopian Medhin, is an Ethiopian football club based in the city of Addis Abeba. They play in the Ethiopian Premier League, the top division of professional football in Ethiopia.

History 
The Club parted ways with their manager of less than a year Derege Belay in April 2018.

Finances 
In 2019, Medhin had a dispute with some of its players over unpaid wages.

Departments

Active Departments 

 Football Team (U17)

Honors

Domestic 

 Ethiopian Cup: 2
1995, 2002

African 
CAF Cup Winners' Cup: 1 appearance
2003 – First Round

CAF Cup: 1 appearance
1993 – Semi-Final
1999 – First Round

Players

First-team squad 
As of 9 December 2020

Former Managers 

  Derege Belay
 Yared Tolera (2019-2020)
 Asrat Haile

Former players 

  Aseged Tesfaye
 Wondyifraw Getahun
 Asrat Shegere

References

Football clubs in Addis Ababa
Financial services association football clubs in Ethiopia